Witheren is a rural locality in the Scenic Rim Region, Queensland, Australia. In the  Witheren had a population of 496 people.

History 

Witheren State School opened on 21 August 1899. In 1936 tenders were called for a new school building. The new school building was officially opened on Friday 4 June 1937 by the Minister for Public Instruction, Frank Cooper. The school closed on 9 May 1965. It was at 97 Upper Coomera Road. The school building has been converted to a private residence.

In the  Witheren had a population of 496 people.

Geography
The Coomera River flows through from south to north.

Road infrastructure
The Beaudesert Nerang Road (State Route 90) runs through from west to north.

Education
There are no schools in Witheren. The nearest government primary schools are Canungra State School in neighbouring Canungra to the west, St Bernards State School in neighbouring Tamborine Mountain to the north and Beechmont State School in neighbouring Beechmont to the south-east. The nearest government secondary schools are Tamborine Mountain State High School in neighbouring Tamborine Mountain to the north and Nerang State High School in Nerang to the east.

References 

Scenic Rim Region
Localities in Queensland